Peter Žiga (born 27 July 1972 in Košice, Czechoslovakia)) is a Slovak politician and businessman, a member of the National Council for Voice - Social Democracy (Hlas-SD), and previously Direction – Social Democracy (SMER-SD). He was formerly Minister of the Environment (2012-2016) and Minister of the Economy (2016-2020) of Slovakia.

Political career
Žiga served as a state secretary for the Ministry of Economy of the Slovak Republic from 2006 to 2010. He was a SMER-SD Member of Parliament from 2010 to 2012, returning in 2012 to be Minister of the Environment. In 2016, he moved to become Minister of Economy.

In June 2020, Žiga left SMER-SD with 10 fellow MPs and former prime minister Peter Pellegrini, to establish a new political party, Voice – Social Democracy (Hlas-SD).

Corruption allegations
Since the beginning of his term as Minister of the Environment, Žiga has been investigated for corruption related to state-owned forests, from which his own private company is alleged to have benefited. The current government, elected in 2020, has launched investigations into several cases dating from during Žiga's tenure at the Ministry of the Environment, including alleged theft of public funds and Eurofunds, signing of unfavorable contracts for the export of timber, and channelling of millions in European Union subsidies to companies connected with SMER-SD.

References

1972 births
Living people
Politicians from Košice
University of Economics in Bratislava alumni
Members of the National Council (Slovakia) 2010-2012
Members of the National Council (Slovakia) 2020-present
Direction – Social Democracy politicians
Economy ministers of Slovakia
Environment ministers of Slovakia